Samuel Honywood (born 19 October 1996) is an English teen actor best known for having portrayed Sebastian Brown in Nanny McPhee.

Samuel Thomas Courtenay Honywood is the only son of Rupert and Wendy Honywood.

Filmography

Awards & nominations

References

External links

1996 births
Living people
English male child actors
English male film actors